FC Dallas is an American professional soccer club based in the Dallas–Fort Worth metroplex Made by Lamar Hunt . The club competes as a member of the Western Conference in Major League Soccer (MLS). The franchise began play in 1996 as a charter club of the league. The club was founded in 1995 as the Dallas Burn before adopting its current name in 2004.

Since 2005, Dallas have played in the DFW area's northern suburbs at the 20,500-capacity soccer-specific Toyota Stadium in Frisco, Texas; home games in the club's early years were played at the Cotton Bowl. The team is owned by the Hunt Sports Group led by brothers Clark Hunt and Dan Hunt, who is the team's president. The Hunt family also owns the NFL's Kansas City Chiefs and part of the Chicago Bulls.

FC Dallas in 2016 won their first Supporters' Shield. In 2010 they were runners-up in the MLS Cup, losing to the Colorado Avalanche in extra time. The team has won the U.S. Open Cup on two occasions (in 1997 and again in 2016). Their fully owned USL affiliate, North Texas SC, won the 2019 USL League One regular season and overall championship titles, the third division title in American soccer. The International Federation of Football History & Statistics, in its Club World Ranking for the year ending December 31, 2016, placed FC Dallas as the 190th best club in the world and the ninth best club in CONCACAF.

The Toros' academy is reputed for its player development, having produced several players who have gone on to feature for European clubs and the United States men's national soccer team such as Weston McKennie, Reggie Cannon, Ricardo Pepi, and Chris Richards.

History

Dallas Burn era: 1996–2004 

Dallas was awarded a Major League Soccer franchise on June 6, 1995, the same day as teams were awarded to Kansas City and Colorado. The team was given its name for the burning in the Texan oilfields and the state's hot weather. On October 17, former Mexico international Hugo Sánchez was designated to the team as their first player. Initially not attracting investors, the Burn was financed by the league itself.

On April 14, 1996, the Dallas Burn played their first game, defeating the San Jose Clash in a shootout win in front of a crowd of 27,779 fans at the Cotton Bowl. Five days later, Jason Kreis scored the team's first goal in a 3–0 home win over the Wiz. With a record of 17–15, the Burn finished in second in the Western Conference behind the Los Angeles Galaxy. They lost in the best of three playoff semifinals to the Wiz after three games, the last one being decided by a shootout. Their first campaign in the U.S. Open Cup ended with a 2–3 home defeat in the semifinals against D.C. United. In their second season, the Burn again reached the playoffs, where they lost in the conference finals to the Colorado Rapids. Later in 1997, they won their first U.S. Open Cup by defeating the MLS Cup champions, D.C. United. In 1999, striker Kreis was voted the league's MVP for a season in which he became the first player to reach 15 goals and 15 assists. That season ended in the playoffs with a defeat to the Galaxy in the conference finals. In October 2000, head coach Dave Dir was fired, despite again taking the team to the playoffs for the fifth consecutive time.

Dir's replacement in January 2001 was Mike Jeffries, who had won the 1998 MLS Cup and two U.S. Open Cups with the Chicago Fire. In his first season in charge, which was cut short as a result of the September 11 attacks, Dallas lost in the playoff quarterfinals to Jeffries' former team. They were also eliminated in the second round of the 2001 U.S. Open Cup by the Seattle Sounders Select, an amateur team from the third-tier Premier Development League. The 2002 season ended with a third-place finish in the West and overall for Dallas, along with an early playoffs exit to the Colorado Rapids. For the 2003 season, the Burn relocated their home games from the Cotton Bowl to the much lower capacity Dragon Stadium (a high school football stadium) in Southlake, which is a northern Fort Worth suburb. The team performed poorly in 2003 and Jeffries was fired in September. He was temporarily replaced by his assistant, former Northern Ireland international Colin Clarke. The team missed the playoffs for the first time, having been one of only two teams to have qualified on all seven prior occasions.

For the 2004 season, Clarke was named the permanent coach and the team returned to the Cotton Bowl, for a campaign in which they again missed the playoffs. In August, club owner Lamar Hunt announced that the club would be re-branded and known as "FC Dallas" to coincide with their new soccer-specific stadium in Frisco for the 2005 season.

FC Dallas era: 2005–present 

In March 2005, FC Dallas signed Guatemalan forward Carlos Ruiz, who had scored 50 goals in 72 games for the Galaxy and earned the MVP award for helping them to the 2002 MLS Cup. On August 6, FC Dallas played their inaugural game at Pizza Hut Park and tied the New York/New Jersey MetroStars, 2–2. Ranked second in the West behind the San Jose Earthquakes, Dallas returned to the playoffs for the first time in two seasons, losing in the conference semifinals to Colorado in a penalty kick shootout, with Roberto Miña's attempt saved by Joe Cannon. In 2006, the team finished the regular season at the top of the Western Conference, but lost in the playoffs in the conference semifinals again, leading to Clarke's dismissal. He was replaced by Steve Morrow. In 2007, a third consecutive playoff appearance ended at the same stage with a 4–2 aggregate defeat to fellow Texas club, the Houston Dynamo, who would go on to win their second consecutive MLS Cup. In 2005 and 2007, Dallas reached their first two U.S. Open Cup finals since their 1997 victory, losing both by one-goal margins to the Galaxy and the New England Revolution respectively. For the following two seasons, Dallas missed the MLS playoffs. During the 2008 season, Morrow was replaced by Schellas Hyndman. In 2009, the club signed Bryan Leyva as the club's first Homegrown Player from its development academy.

In 2010, Dallas played in the MLS Cup for the first time, losing 2–1 after extra time to Colorado at BMO Field in Toronto, after an own goal by George John. They were the last of the surviving original MLS clubs to appear in the MLS Cup final. On-loan Colombian midfielder David Ferreira was voted the league's MVP, having missed only one minute of the season, and Hyndman won the MLS Coach of the Year Award.

By finishing as runners-up in the MLS Cup, Dallas competed in the 2011–12 CONCACAF Champions League, their first time in the leading continental tournament. Following a victory in the preliminary round against Alianza F.C. of El Salvador, they reached the group stage. In the first group game, Marvin Chávez's goal defeated Mexican champions UNAM at the Estadio Olímpico Universitario, making Dallas the first MLS team to win an away match in the Champions League against a Mexican team. The team followed this achievement with a victory by the same score at Toronto FC, but did not win any of their four remaining games and were eliminated from the competition after finishing in third place in their group. In October 2013, Hyndman resigned as head coach after a second consecutive season without making the playoffs.

Three months after Hyndman's resignation, his replacement was confirmed to be Colombian and former Dallas player and assistant coach Óscar Pareja, who had resigned from the Colorado Rapids after two seasons as head coach there. Pareja led the club back to the playoffs in 2014. Dallas finished in first place in the Western Conference in 2015. They defeated the Seattle Sounders FC in the conference semifinals, only to fall to the Portland Timbers in the Western Conference finals.

First double 

Their regular season performance earned them a return to the Champions League for 2016–17. In 2016 the club won their first Supporters' Shield and second U.S. Open Cup. For the third consecutive year, they met the Sounders in the conference semifinals, this time losing 4–2 on aggregate.
Dallas, in their return in the Champions league, had advanced from the group stage and into the knockout round. The club was eliminated by Pachuca, in their home and away semifinal series, after a late goal in overtime from Hirving Lozano.

Colors and badge 

Originally, the Dallas Burn played in a predominantly red-and-black color scheme, and had a logo which featured a fire-breathing black mustang behind a stylized red "Burn" wordmark. The logo and the original colors of red and black were revealed at an event in New York City on October 17, 1995.

The team re-branded as FC Dallas in 2005 to coincide with their move to Pizza Hut Park in the middle of that season and has since played in a color scheme of red, white, silver, and blue, and a uniform design of horizontally hooped stripes. The colors are officially listed as Republic Red, Lonestar White, Bovine Blue, and Shawnee Silver. Red remained as a primary color in their home uniforms, with blue eventually becoming a primary color of their away uniforms. The club badge was also changed with a bull replacing the mustang. In July 2012, the team wore their first sponsored jerseys, bearing the logo of Texan sports nutrition manufacturers AdvoCare. For the 2014 and 2015 seasons, the hoops were a different shade of red rather than a contrasting white. The jersey also incorporated the motto "Dallas 'Til I Die" on the inside of the collar and the initials "LH" on the back for Lamar Hunt.

Stadium 

FC Dallas has had three different home stadiums, each of which has been located in the Dallas–Fort Worth metroplex.

From its foundation, the team played in the 92,100-capacity Cotton Bowl in Dallas. In an effort to save money due to the club's unfavorable lease with the Cotton Bowl, the club played its 2003 home games at Dragon Stadium, a high school stadium in Southlake, a Fort Worth suburb.  After listening to its fans, the team moved back to the Cotton Bowl for the 2004 season.

In August 2005, the club moved into Pizza Hut Park, a 19,096-capacity  soccer-specific stadium in the northern suburb of Frisco. After Pizza Hut left as a primary sponsor, the stadium was renamed as Toyota Stadium in September 2013. The stadium is part of a complex with 17 soccer fields, booked more than 350 days per year with annual visits of 1.8 million people. The stadium's south end was extensively remodeled in 2018, including a new home for the National Soccer Hall of Fame.

Uniform evolution 

 Primary	
	

 	
 Secondary	

 	
	
 Third/Special

Club culture

Mascot 

The mascot of FC Dallas is a bull named Tex Hooper. His fictional biography, by the team, states that he was born on September 6, 1996, in Frisco, Texas.

Supporters 

FC Dallas has two recognized supporters groups: Dallas Beer Guardians and El Matador.

Rivalries 

FC Dallas' main rival is the Houston Dynamo in the Texas Derby. The two teams reside in the same state and compete for El Capitan, a working replica Civil War cannon that goes to the regular season victor.

Animosity grew between fans and players of FC Dallas and the Colorado Rapids, mainly sparking from Colorado players' comments towards the fans and Colorado's victories over FC Dallas in the 2005 and 2006 MLS Cup Playoffs.

In addition to the Texas Derby, the team also competes in two other MLS rivalry cups. The Brimstone Cup against the Chicago Fire, so named for the allusions to fire in both teams' names when FC Dallas was the Dallas Burn, was inaugurated by the fans in 2001. The Lamar Hunt Pioneer Cup has been contested against Columbus Crew SC since 2007. It is named after Lamar Hunt, who was an investor in both teams. Due to league expansion and realignment, FC Dallas only plays Chicago and Columbus once a year now in the regular season, which has led to decreased importance of these two rivalry cups, especially when compared to the Texas Derby.

Song 

During a period where MLS created songs for each club, the team anthem was "H-O-O-P-S Yes!" and was performed by Dallas natives The Polyphonic Spree, a choral symphonic rock group.

Academy 
The FC Dallas Academy has produced talent including Weston McKennie, Chris Richards, Nico Carrera, Reggie Cannon, Christian Cappis, Jesus Ferreira, Brandon Servania, Ricardo Pepi and Bryan Reynolds. In 2020, they were ranked the number one academy in MLS by David Kerr on chasingacup.com MLS Academy rankings.

Affiliated teams 

FC Dallas was formally associated with Oklahoma City Energy FC of the USL Championship, the second tier of the American soccer pyramid. They were affiliated with Arizona United SC of the USL in 2015. Abroad, the team was previously affiliated to Tigres de la UANL of Mexico and Clube Atlético Paranaense of Brazil.

On November 2, 2018, it was announced by United Soccer League that Dallas would be granted a side to play in USL League One, its newly created third division for 2019. The club then officially announced their name, North Texas SC, and crest on December 6, 2018. The club is owned and operated by FC Dallas.

Sponsorship 

Pizza Hut was the title sponsor of the club's stadium and complex when it opened in 2005. On June 27, 2012, FC Dallas reached a three-year sponsorship deal with AdvoCare, a Plano-based health and wellness company, worth US$7.5M making AdvoCare the official jersey sponsor. After the 2012 season, Pizza Hut ended their relationship with the club, and the stadium was temporarily renamed as FC Dallas Stadium. In September 2013 FC Dallas reached a long-term deal with Toyota to be official stadium naming rights partners, and the stadium was once again renamed, this time as Toyota Stadium. In October 2014 FC Dallas and AdvoCare announced an extension of the jersey sponsorship through 2020. In February 2021, FC Dallas announced MTX Group, a B2B information technology company based in Frisco, to be its new shirt sponsor, with Advocare remaining as the team's sleeve sponsor. In January 2023, FC Dallas announced a sponsorship deal with Children's Health and UT Southwestern to be its new jersey sponsors.

Broadcasting

Television 
From 2023, every FC Dallas match is available via MLS Season Pass on the Apple TV app.

Prior to the all-streaming deal, the club's non-nationally televised games were primarily broadcast in Dallas on local channel KTXA. This arrangement began with the 2015 season. The club struggled for years to find consistent broadcast partners in the crowded Dallas–Fort Worth sports market. In August 2018, FC Dallas launched the FCDTV Network, comprising local stations KJBO-LP (Amarillo), KMYL-LD (Lubbock), KTPN-LD (Tyler-Longview) and KJBO-LP (Wichita Falls/Lawton). Due to scheduling conflicts with KTXA during the return of 2020 Major League Soccer season from the COVID-19 pandemic, select matches of FC Dallas were moved to Fox Sports Southwest.

On February 25, 2013, FC Dallas signed a deal with Time Warner Cable to air most of its games on the Time Warner Cable Sports Channel in Dallas, replacing Fox Sports Southwest as the primary broadcaster of games. This arrangement lasted for two seasons. It was not popular with fans as the channel was not available on many cable and satellite packages besides those offered by Time Warner. The channel still broadcasts some games that are not broadcast by KTXA. Also, in some areas outside of the Dallas–Fort Worth market, the channel continues to broadcast the club's games.

Until the 2012 season, FC Dallas matches appeared on various local television stations such as KTXA and WFAA (digital channel 8.3), and regional sports network Fox Sports Southwest (often on alternate Fox Sports Southwest Plus channels when conflicting with Texas Rangers, Dallas Mavericks, and Dallas Stars games).

In 2012, Dallas Mavericks play-by-play announcer Mark Followill also became the primary play-by-play announcer for FC Dallas, replacing the late Bobby Rhine. Former Houston Dynamo announcer Jonathan Yardley shared play-by-play responsibilities with Followill in 2012. In 2013, Bob Sturm (weekday early afternoon co-host on sports radio KTCK) replaced Yardley, who has continued to fill in for Followill and Sturm in 2013, 2016, and 2018. The color commentator spot was filled until 2016 by a rotation of former MLS players including: Brian Dunseth, Ian Joy, Kevin Hartman, Steve Jolley, and Dante Washington. FC Dallas employee Daniel Robertson or Sturm (beginning in 2016) filled in when one of the others are not available. Longtime national soccer writer Steve Davis has been the analyst on all matches since 2018. Beginning with the new KTXA deal in 2015, longtime local sports broadcaster Gina Miller hosted a team produced 30-minute pregame show on select broadcasts.

In 2021, FC Dallas announced that Estrella TV would become the first team's Spanish TV broadcast partner for the 2021 and 2022 seasons, with matches appearing on Estrella's Dallas affiliate KMPX. This marked the first ever Spanish language broadcast for FC Dallas on TV.

Radio 
Beginning with the 2018 season, English radio coverage of the club's MLS matches has been on the club's website. Beginning with the 2019 season for locally televised games, the radio coverage has been a simulcast of the audio from the television broadcast. When the club's match is televised nationally with no local coverage, a radio-only broadcast is available online.

Carlos Alvarado and Rafa Calderon provide Spanish language commentary on radio stations such as KFLC and KFZO. Alvarado has been the play-by-play announcer since the inaugural 1996 season, and Calderon has been the color analyst since the 2001 season.

Just like on television, the club struggled to find radio broadcast partners. For several seasons, there were no English radio broadcasts of FC Dallas games. Beginning with the 2014 season, English radio broadcasts (including a postgame show) returned for the club with KWRD-FM becoming the primary radio home for the club's matches. This arrangement continued through the 2017 season. Steve Davis was the initial and most used announcer, calling the games solo.

Players and staff 

 For details on former players, see All-time FC Dallas roster.

Roster

Out on loan

Team management

Head coaches

Honors

Domestic
 MLS Cup
 Runners-up: 2010
 Supporters' Shield
 Winners: 2016
 Runners-up: 2006, 2015
 U.S. Open Cup
 Winners: 1997, 2016
 Runners-up: 2005, 2007

Continental
 CONCACAF Champions League
 Semi-finalists: 2016-17

Record

Year-by-year 

This is a partial list of the last five seasons completed by FC Dallas. For the full season-by-season history, see List of FC Dallas seasons.

1. Avg. attendance include statistics from league matches only.
2. Top goalscorer(s) includes all goals scored in League, MLS Cup Playoffs, U.S. Open Cup, MLS is Back Tournament, CONCACAF Champions League, FIFA Club World Cup, and other competitive continental matches.

MLS Scoring Champion/Golden Boot 

The following players have won the MLS Scoring Champion or Golden Boot.

Top goalscorers

Active player name(s) in bold

International competition 

 1998 CONCACAF Cup Winners' Cup
 Group stage v.  Necaxa – 1–4
 Group stage v.  Cruz Azul – 1–2

 2004 La Manga Cup
 Group stage v.  Odd Grenland – 1–2
 Group stage v.  Dynamo Kyiv – 2–2
 Semi-finals v.  Stabæk – 2–1
 Fifth place match v.  Bodø/Glimt – 1–3

 2007 North American SuperLiga
 Group stage v.  Guadalajara – 1–1
 Group stage v.  Pachuca – 1–1
 Group stage v.  Los Angeles Galaxy – 5–6

 2011–12 CONCACAF Champions League
 Preliminary Round v.  Alianza – 1–0
 Preliminary Round v.  Alianza – 1–0
 Group stage v.  UNAM – 1–0
 Group stage v.  Toronto FC – 1–0
 Group stage v.  Tauro F.C. – 1–1
 Group stage v.  UNAM – 0–2
 Group stage v.  Tauro F.C. – 3–5
 Group stage v.  Toronto FC – 0–3

 2016–17 CONCACAF Champions League
 Group stage v.  Real Estelí – 2–1
 Group stage v.  Real Estelí – 1–1
 Group stage v.  Suchitepéquez – 0–0
 Group stage v.  Suchitepéquez – 5–2
 Quarter-finals v.  Árabe Unido – 4–0
 Quarter-finals v.  Árabe Unido – 1–2
 Semi-finals v.  Pachuca – 2–1
 Semi-finals v.  Pachuca – 1–3

 2018 CONCACAF Champions League
 Round of 16 v.  Tauro F.C. – 0–1
 Round of 16 v.  Tauro F.C. – 3–2

References

External links 
 

 
Association football clubs established in 1995
Soccer clubs in Dallas
Sports in Frisco, Texas
1995 establishments in Texas
Major League Soccer teams
U.S. clubs in CONCACAF Cup Winners' Cup
U.S. Open Cup winners